ESPN College Football Primetime is a live game presentation of Division 1-FBS college football on ESPN or sometimes ESPN2. In the past, the presenting sponsor was Cooper Tires, but since the 2006 season, the current presenting sponsor is Applebee's. The game telecast airs every Thursday night at 7:45pm ET during the college football regular season. The game is preceded by a 30-minute segment with Matt Barrie, Joey Galloway and Jesse Palmer, all of whom also appear on the halftime report. This game telecast is also presented in high definition on ESPNHD.

It has broadcast games from numerous conferences including the SEC, ACC, Sun Belt and the American. This game is often seen as the ESPN Game of the Week along with the Saturday night telecast.

The most visible voices of ESPN College Football Primetime over the years have been Mike Tirico, Kirk Herbstreit and Lee Corso, but none remain in the booth, with Tirico and Herbstreit being promoted and Corso cutting back on his schedule. The current commentators are Matt Barrie on play-by-play, Louis Riddick as analyst and Harry Lyles Jr. as sideline reporter since 2022.

Personalities

Current
Matt Barrie: (play-by-play, 2020–present)
Louis Riddick: (analyst, 2022–present)
Harry Lyles Jr.: (field reporter, 2021–present)

Former

Mike Golic Jr.: (analyst, 2020)
Adam Amin: (play-by-play, 2019)
Erin Andrews: (field reporter, 2005–2009)
Jill Arrington: (field reporter, 2004)
Todd Blackledge (analyst, 1998)
Jenn Brown: (field reporter, 2010–2011)
Lee Corso: (analyst, 1999–2004)
Rece Davis: (play-by-play, 2010–2014)
Gary Danielson: (analyst 1994)
Dave Flemming: (play-by-play, 2016–2018)
Doug Flutie: (analyst, 2007)
Chris Fowler: (play-by-play, 2006–2009)
Mike Gottfried: (analyst, 1992–1998)
Kaylee Hartung: (field reporter, 2015)
Matt Hasselbeck: (analyst, 2019)
Kirk Herbstreit: (analyst, 1999–2006)
Craig James: (analyst, 2007–2011)
Roddy Jones: (analyst, 2021)
Pat McAfee: (analyst, 2019)
Molly McGrath: (field reporter, 2019)
Brad Nessler: (play-by-play, 1994)
Jesse Palmer: (analyst, 2008–2016)
Mike Patrick: (play-by-play, 1992–1997)
David Pollack: (analyst, 2012–2015)
Samantha Ponder: (field reporter, 2012–2014)
Jerry Punch: (field reporter, 1992–2003)
Laura Rutledge: (field reporter, 2016–2018)
Joe Tessitore: (play-by-play, 2015)
Mike Tirico: (play-by-play, 1997–2005)

By year

Game features
Starting Lineups: The starting lineups are presented during the first possession of each team's offense and defense.
Impact Players: Following the starting lineups, Barrie and Jones run down the top two or three impact players on each team's side of the ball.
Halftime Report: Kevin Connors, Joey Galloway and Jesse Palmer present the halftime report, which features analysis of the first half, highlights of earlier games and a look at other happenings in the sports world.

See also
College GameDay
College Football Scoreboard
College Football Final
ESPN College Football Saturday Primetime
ESPN2 College Football Saturday Primetime
Saturday Night Football

References

1990s American television series
2000s American television series
2010s American television series
ESPN original programming
American sports television series
Thursday